The Treaty of Accession 1985 was the agreement between the member states of the European Communities, Spain and Portugal, concerning these countries' accession into the EC. It entered into force on 1 January 1986. The Treaty arranged accession of Spain and Portugal to the EC and amended earlier treaties of the European Communities. As such it is an integral part of the constitutional basis of the European Union.

Full title
The full official name of the treaty is:

See also
Enlargement of the European Union

References 

1985 in the European Economic Community
Treaties of Accession to the European Union
Treaties entered into force in 1986
Treaties concluded in 1985
Treaties of Austria
Treaties of Belgium
Treaties of Denmark
Treaties of France
Treaties of West Germany
Treaties of Greece
Treaties of Ireland
Treaties of Italy
Treaties of Luxembourg
Treaties of the Netherlands
Treaties of Portugal
Treaties of Spain
Treaties of the United Kingdom
1985 in Spain
1985 in Portugal